The Desert Patrol Vehicle (DPV), formerly called the Fast Attack Vehicle (FAV), is a high-speed, lightly armored sandrail-like vehicle first used in combat during the Gulf War in 1991. Due to their dash speed and off-road mobility, the DPVs were used extensively during Operation Desert Storm. The first U.S. forces to enter Kuwait City were United States Navy SEALs in DPVs.

Performance
The DPV was built by Chenowth Racing Products, Inc. The German Volkswagen Kübelwagen was the first military Light Utility Vehicle based on the Volkswagen Beetle which uses rear-wheel rather than four-wheel drive. Volkswagen components were also the basis for the postwar dune buggy, and its layout is used in the DPV with rear-mounted air-cooled  Volkswagen engine.

History
The DPV is a variant of the Fast Attack Vehicle, which was developed during the 1980s as part of the United States Army's High Technology Light Division (9th Infantry Division). The HTLD was given carte blanche to develop doctrine, decide force structure, and design equipment by then Army Chief of Staff Edward C. Meyer. One of the pieces of equipment created was the Fast Attack Vehicle. Chenowth delivered 120 FAVs to the Army in 1982. HTTB (High Technology Test Bed) in the units in the 9th Infantry were first to deploy these vehicles. Along with light off-road motorcycles, the FAV was intended to provide a highly mobile component to the mostly foot infantry unit.

Eventually, the FAVs were replaced by Humvees in general military use, which did not provide nearly the speed nor extreme off-road capabilities of the FAVs. FAVs were transferred to special forces use where it has been largely replaced by the Light Strike Vehicle.

Armament
The original tests used commercial dune buggies modified to carry weapons such as TOW missiles and recoilless rifles. However, the recoilless rifles still had enough recoil to flip the lightweight dune buggies and were abandoned. The TOW missiles had much greater success, but they violated existing Army TOW doctrine. The Army had determined that a TOW needed a 3-man team to operate it. The DPVs could only carry a two-man crew and they seemed perfectly capable of operating the TOW, but this would have meant revising Army doctrine and possibly changing TOW deployment throughout the Army. Fort Benning decided to offer a "superior" DPV design that allowed a third crewman. This design was rejected by the HTLD team and was never produced.

The basic weapons on a DPV consist of a heavy .50 caliber M2 Browning machine gun, two lighter 7.62×51mm M60 machine guns, and two M136 AT4 anti-armor weapons. In some cases, the driver's M60 or the gunner's M2 is replaced with a 40 mm Mk 19 grenade launcher. Other light machine guns such as the M240 machine gun or 5.56×45mm M249 SAW can also be mounted.

Similar US equipment
The United States Marines Corps also fielded a Fast Attack Vehicle – a completely different piece of equipment based on the venerable M151 1/4-ton. This FAV stayed in use long after the fielding of the HMMWV because it could fit on Marine Corps helicopters while the wider HMMWV could not. In 1999, this FAV began to be replaced with the Interim Fast Attack Vehicle (IFAV) a version of the Mercedes-Benz MB 290 GD 1.5 ton truck.

See also
Kojak (vehicle)
Light Strike Vehicle
Chenowth Advanced Light Strike Vehicle
Long Range Desert Group
ULTRA AP
Willys FAMAE Corvo
VLEGA Gaucho/Chivunk
Fabrique Nationale AS 24
Light Strike Vehicle (Singapore)
Saker LSV

Notes and references

Soft-skinned vehicles
Military vehicles of the United States
Military light utility vehicles
Military vehicles introduced in the 1980s